Saugor (station code: SGO) is a railway station in Sagar city in Madhya Pradesh. It is operated by the West Central Railway, with its headquarters at Jabalpur. Saugor is a 'A' Category railway station of West Central Railway zone of Indian Railways. Saugor is a major railway station of Bina–Katni line. The station consists of two platforms. Passenger, Express and Superfast trains halt here.

See also

References

Railway stations in Sagar district
Jabalpur railway division